Mark Abene (born February 23, 1972) is an American information security expert and entrepreneur, originally from New York City. Better known by his pseudonym Phiber Optik, he was once a member of the hacker groups Legion of Doom and Masters of Deception.

Phiber Optik was a high-profile hacker in the 1980s and early 1990s, appearing in The New York Times, Harper's, Esquire, and in debates and on television. He is an important figure in the 1995 nonfiction book Masters of Deception: The Gang That Ruled Cyberspace.

Early life
Abene's first contact with computers was at around 9 years of age at a local department store, where he would often pass the time while his parents shopped. His first computer was a TRS-80 MC-10 with 4 kilobytes of RAM, a 32-column screen, no lower case, and a cassette tape recorder to load and save programs. As was customary at the time, the computer connected to a television set for use as a monitor. 

After receiving the gifts of a RAM upgrade (to 20K) and a 300 baud modem from his parents, he used his computer to access CompuServe and shortly after discovered the world of dialup BBSes via people he met on CompuServe's "CB simulator", the first nationwide online chat. On some of these BBSes, Abene discovered dialups and guest accounts to DEC minicomputers running the RSTS/E and TOPS-10 operating systems as part of the BOCES educational program in Long Island, New York. Accessing those DEC minicomputers he realized there was a programming environment that was much more powerful than that of his own home computer, and so he began taking books out of the library in order to learn the programming languages that were now available to him. This and the ability to remotely save and load back programs that would still be there the next time he logged in had a profound effect on Abene, who came to view his rather simple computer as a window into a much larger world.

Having learned about programming and fundamental security concepts during those early years, Abene further honed his skill in understanding the intricacies of the nationwide telephone network. In the mid-1980s he was first introduced to members of the Legion of Doom (LOD), a loosely knit group of highly respected teenage hackers who shared Abene's uncompromising desire to understand technology.

Legal tribulations
On January 24, 1990, Abene and other MOD members had their homes searched and property seized by the U.S. Secret Service, largely based on government suspicions of having caused AT&T Corporation's network crash just over a week earlier on January 15 (Abene was personally accused by the Secret Service of having done as much, during the search and seizure). Some weeks later, AT&T admitted that the crash was the result of a flawed software update to the switching systems on their long-distance network, thus, human error on their part. In February 1991, Abene was arrested and charged with computer tampering and computer trespass in the first degree, New York state offenses. Laws at the time were considered a “gray area” concerning information security. Abene, who was a minor at the time, pleaded "not guilty" to the first two offenses and ultimately accepted a plea agreement to a lesser misdemeanor charge, and was sentenced to 35 hours of community service.

Abene and four other members of the Masters of Deception were also arrested in December 1991 and indicted by a Manhattan federal grand jury on July 8, 1992, on an 11-count charge. The indictment relied heavily on evidence collected by court-approved wire tapping of telephone conversations between MOD members. According to U.S. Attorney Otto Obermaier, it was the "first investigative use of court-authorized wiretaps to obtain conversations and data transmissions of computer hackers" in the United States.

According to a July 9, 1992 newsletter from the Electronic Frontier Foundation, the defendants faced a maximum term of 50 years in prison and fines of $2.5 million if found guilty on all counts. Despite the fact that Abene was a minor at the time the crimes were allegedly committed, was only involved in a small fraction of the sub-charges, and often in a passive way, a plea arrangement resulted in by far the harshest sentence: 12 months imprisonment, three years probation and 600 hours of community service.

After serving the one-year sentence at the Federal Prison "Camp" in Schuylkill, Pennsylvania, Abene was released in November 1994. In January 1995, a huge celebration called "Phiberphest '95" was held in his honor at Manhattan's Irving Plaza ballroom/nightclub. In Time, Joshua Quittner called him "the first underground hero of the Information Age, the Robin Hood of cyberspace." Upon leaving jail, Phiber Optik made the @Cafe his hang out spot.

Social protests
Many people inside and outside of the hacker world felt that Abene was made an example of, and was not judged according to earlier court standards. Abene had built up a significant reputation in the hacker sub-culture, for example regularly appearing on the radio show Off the Hook, hosted by Eric Corley (a.k.a. Emmanuel Goldstein), debating and defending the morals and motivations of hackers in public forums and in interviews, and lecturing on the history of telecommunications technology at the night courses of several New York City universities. At the time of the indictment he was working at MindVox, an early BBS/ISP founded by two New York LOD members, and subsequently on EchoNYC, a multi-user BBS and early ISP.

ECHO users, ECHO management themselves and hackers around the nation expected Abene to get off with probation or at most a few months of jail time. Co-defendants and previous offenders charged with "hacking" offenses had received rather lenient punishments, and given his new-found enthusiasm for using his knowledge to constructive ends, the general feeling was optimistic prior to sentencing.

A statement made by U.S. Attorney Otto Obermeier in conjunction with the indication was "The message that ought to be delivered with this indictment is that such conduct will not be tolerated, irrespective of the age of the particular accused or their ostensible purpose," was interpreted by Abene's supporters to mean that MOD was made an example of, to show that the authorities could handle the perceived "hacker threat". During sentencing, Judge Stanton said that "the defendant stands as a symbol here today," and that "hacking crimes constitute a real threat to the expanding information highway", reinforcing the view that a relatively harmless "teacher" was judged as a symbol for all hackers.

Professional life
Abene has spoken on the subject of security in many publications such as The New York Times, The Washington Post, The Wall Street Journal, and Time. He has appeared as a speaker at both hacker and security industry conferences worldwide and frequently visits universities to speak to students about information security.

After some years as a security consultant, he joined forces with former Legion of Doom member Dave Buchwald and a third colleague, Andrew Brown, to create the security consulting firm Crossbar Security. Crossbar provided consulting services for third party companies, during which the principals conducted business in the U.S., Japan, Brazil, and Sweden. As a result of the "dot com" bust Crossbar ultimately went defunct in 2001, largely due to cuts in corporate security spending.

Abene made his acting début as "The Inside Man" in the fiction film Urchin, completed in 2006 and released in the US in February 2007, in which other hacker notables such as Dave Buchwald and Emmanuel Goldstein can be seen. In 2009, he founded TraceVector, an intrusion detection firm that makes use of supercomputing and data analytics. He currently resides in Silicon Valley.

References

Bibliography
 The Rise and Fall of Information Security in the Western World. Speech by Mark Abene, Hack in the Box security conference, Kuala Lumpur, Malaysia, 2007. 
 CNET Q&A: Mark Abene, from 'Phiber Optik' to security guru.  
 New York Software Industry Association. 
 Goldstein, Emmanuel (2001). Freedom Downtime, opening sequence.
 Savage, Annaliza (September 1995). Notes from the underground — Phiber Optik goes directly to jail. .net Issue 10.
 Quittner, Joshua (January 23, 1995). Hacker Homecoming. TIME.
 Dibbell, Julian (January 12, 1994). Prisoner: Phiber Optik Goes Directly to Jail. The Village Voice
 Sterling, Bruce (January 1994). The Hacker Crackdown — Law and Disorder on the Electronic Frontier. . From Project Gutenberg.
 Goldstein, Emmanuel (November 10, 1993). Interview with Phiber Optik. Off the Hook radio show. (Online archive)
 Electronic Frontier Foundation (July 9, 1992). Federal hacking indictments issued against five in New York City. Retrieved September 4, 2004
 Newsbytes (July 9, 1992). New York Computer Crime Indictments. Retrieved September 11, 2004.
 Grand jury, United States District Court Southern District of New York (1992). Indictment of Julio Fernandez, John Lee, Mark Abene, Elias Ladopoulos, Paul Stira. (Copy from Computer underground Digest, 4:31).
 All Circuits are Busy Now: The 1990 AT&T Long Distance Network Collapse.

External links
 The History of MOD
 modbook1.txt — "The History of MOD: Book One: The Originals"
 modbook2.txt — "The History of MOD: Book Two: Creative Mindz"
 modbook3.txt — "The Book of MOD: Part Three: A Kick in the Groin"
 modbook4.txt — "The Book of MOD: Part Four: End of '90-'1991"
 modbook5.txt — "The Book of MOD: Part 5: Who are They And Where Did They Come From? (Summer 1991)"
 Phiber Optik Goes to Prison — Article in Wired by Julian Dibbell
 Off the Hook shows (available as MP3 files)
 1991-03-13, "Phiber Optik's" first appearance on the show. .
 1993-11-03, announcement of Mark Abene's sentence. No recording exists. .
 1993-11-10, the first show following the sentencing, Phiber Optik in the studio. .
 1994-01-05, last show before Phiber Optik's going to prison. .

1972 births
Computer security specialists
Legion of Doom (hacker group)
Living people
Masters of Deception
Businesspeople from New York City
Phreaking